Callipara is a genus of sea snails, marine gastropod mollusks in the family Volutidae.

Species
The following species are recognised in the genus Callipara:
 Callipara africana (Reeve, 1856)
 Callipara aikeni Veldsman, 2012
 Callipara aphrodite (Bondarev, 1999)
 Callipara bullatiana (Weaver & du Pont, 1967)
 Callipara casaana Childs, R. Aiken & Bail, 2020
 Callipara duponti (Weaver, 1968)
 Callipara festiva (Lamarck, 1811)
 Callipara kurodai (Kawamura, 1964)
 Callipara ponsonbyi (Smith, 1901)
 Callipara queketti (Smith, 1901)
 Callipara veldsmani Veldsman, 2012
 Callipara victoriae Childs, R. Aiken & Bail, 2020
 Callipara zululandensis Veldsman, 2012

Description
Some of the species of the genus Callipara have a radula with vestigial lateral teeth. Teleoconch whorls are shouldered and nodulose, with the three early whorls axially ribbed. They often have with a black blotch near the siphonal canal and the upper part of the aperture. All species have a shoulder, except in Callipara bullatiana where the well-defined shoulder changes at a slight angle.

Distribution
The snails of this genus are found in the Indian Ocean off East Africa.

References

 Bail, P & Poppe, G. T. 2001. A conchological iconography: a taxonomic introduction of the recent Volutidae. Hackenheim-Conchbook, 30 pp, 5 pl. (updated October 2008 for WoRMS)

External links
 Gray, J. E. (1847). A list of the genera of recent Mollusca, their synonyma and types. Proceedings of the Zoological Society of London. 15: 129-219

Volutidae
Gastropod genera